William Doherty (1857–1901) was an American entomologist.

William Doherty may also refer to:
 William Doherty (priest) (fl. 1869–1922), Archdeacon of Perth in the Diocese of Huron, Anglican Church of Canada
 Bill Doherty Jr. (born 1982), American actor
 Billy Doherty (born 1958), drummer for Northern Ireland band The Undertones
 Will Doherty, American activist and executive
 William David Doherty (1893–1966), English-born rugby international for Ireland and surgeon
 William H. Doherty (1907–2000), American electrical engineer
 Willie Doherty (born 1959), Northern Irish photographer and video artist
William C. Doherty (1902–1987), American labor union leader and ambassador